Carin Anderholm (born 11 March  1966) is a former professional tennis player from Sweden who won the 1983 French Open girls' doubles championship with Helena Olsson and played on the WTA tour.

ITF Finals

Singles (0–3)

Doubles (1–0)

References

Swedish female tennis players
Living people
1966 births
Grand Slam (tennis) champions in girls' doubles
French Open junior champions
20th-century Swedish women
21st-century Swedish women